William F. Moen Jr. (born November 14, 1986) is an American Democratic Party politician from Camden, who has represented the 5th Legislative District in the New Jersey General Assembly since taking office on January 14, 2020, at which time he was the state's youngest legislator in the Assembly.

New Jersey Assembly 
Before taking office in the Assembly, Moen served on the Camden County Board of Chosen Freeholders from 2016 to 2019, where he was one of the youngest people elected to serve as freeholder. Moen resigned from his position as freeholder in March 2019 in order to focus on his run for assembly and was replaced by Melinda Kane.

Raised in Runnemede, Moen has been a resident of Camden.

District 5 
Each of the 40 districts in the New Jersey Legislature has one representative in the New Jersey Senate and two members in the New Jersey General Assembly. The representatives from the 5th District for the 2022—2023 Legislative Session are:
Senator Nilsa Cruz-Perez (D), 
Assemblyman Bill Moen (D) and
Assemblyman William Spearman (D)

Electoral history

Assembly

References

External links
Legislative webpage

1986 births
Living people
21st-century American politicians
County commissioners in New Jersey
Democratic Party members of the New Jersey General Assembly
People from Runnemede, New Jersey
Politicians from Camden, New Jersey
Rowan University alumni
University of Pennsylvania alumni